Mount Energy Historic District is a national historic district located at Mount Energy, Granville County, North Carolina. The district encompasses six contributing buildings in the crossroads community of Mount Energy.  They are a Greek Revival style store and Masonic Lodge dated to about 1845, a store from the 1920s, and three sheds.

It was listed on the National Register of Historic Places in 1988.

References

Historic districts on the National Register of Historic Places in North Carolina
Greek Revival architecture in North Carolina
Commercial buildings completed in 1845
Buildings and structures in Granville County, North Carolina
National Register of Historic Places in Granville County, North Carolina
1988 establishments in North Carolina